The Bugs Bunny Crazy Castle 2, known in Japan as ミッキーマウスII (Mickey Mouse II) and in Europe as Mickey Mouse or Hugo, is a video game originally developed by Kemco for the Game Boy in 1991. It is the sequel to the 1989 Nintendo Entertainment System and Game Boy game The Bugs Bunny Crazy Castle.

The Japanese version was followed by a sequel for the Family Computer, Mickey Mouse III: Balloon Dreams.

Gameplay and plot
Bugs Bunny must save his girlfriend Honey Bunny from Witch Hazel's enemy-filled castle. There are 28 levels with keys to collect. In each level is a locked door leading to the next level; to open it, the player must collect eight keys placed throughout the level. Various Looney Tunes characters are encountered, including Yosemite Sam, Daffy Duck, Wile E. Coyote, Little Ghost, Moth and the Flame, Sylvester, Foghorn Leghorn, Tasmanian Devil, Beaky Buzzard, Marc Antony, Merlin the Magic Mouse, and Tweety.

In the 1995 European conversion, converted into the Hugo franchise, Hugo the troll's wife Hugolina gets kidnapped by the Horned King, ruler of the castle Arbarus, after agreeing to his invitation. Hugo goes to the castle to defeat the Horned King and rescue Hugolina.

Reception
GamePro writer 'Riff Raff' gave Bugs Bunny Crazy Castle 2 a fairly positive review, opining that "with smooth animation, good fun, and lively action, Bugs Bunny on the Game Boy is actually better than the NES version." In August 1998, the Hugo version received a "Platinum" sales award from the Verband der Unterhaltungssoftware Deutschland (VUD), indicating sales of at least 200,000 units across Germany, Austria and Switzerland.

References

External links
The Bugs Bunny Crazy Castle 2 at MobyGames

1991 video games
Action video games
Game Boy-only games
Game Boy games
Hugo video games
Kemco games
Mickey Mouse video games
Seika Corporation games
Video games developed in Japan
Video games featuring Bugs Bunny
Video games about witchcraft
Video games set in castles
Warner Bros. video games